or  is a traditional Catholic salutation, which members of religious communities commonly use, especially those of specific ethnicities. The answer to this greeting is typically semper laudetur 'Always be praised', in saecula saeculorum! Amen 'forever and ever! Amen' or (Nunc et) in aeternum! Amen '(Now and) forever! Amen'. The Missionary Oblates of Mary Immaculate, however, respond et Maria Immaculata 'And Mary Immaculate'. The phrase is also a motto of Vatican Radio.

Pius Parsch noted the traditional Catholic use of the salutation:

"The [H]umanity of Christ is near in the priest. The Catholic people have kept this belief: 'Praised be Jesus Christ' they say whenever the priest comes."

In Luxembourg, the salutation translated as "Gelobt sei Jesus Christus" is taught as "the respectful greeting [...] in addressing a priest".

Other Christian denominations also use it, including Lutherans and other Protestants, and some Eastern Christians.

See also

 List of ecclesiastical abbreviations
 List of Latin phrases

References

Latin religious words and phrases
Greeting words and phrases